In October 1969 186th Army Division() was formed from 2nd Engineer District, Engineer Corps of Beijing Military Region. The division was a part of 63rd Army Corps.

In December 1969 the division was renamed as 189th Army Division(), and all its regiments were re-designated as:
565th Infantry Regiment;
566th Infantry Regiment;
567th Infantry Regiment;
Artillery Regiment.

In July 1985 the division was disbanded.

References

中国人民解放军各步兵师沿革, http://blog.sina.com.cn/s/blog_a3f74a990101cp1q.html

189
Military units and formations established in 1969
Military units and formations disestablished in 1985